Suzzanna Martha Frederika van Osch (13 October 1942 – 15 October 2008), was an Indonesian actress. Known as the "queen of Indonesian horror", she is well known in particular in Indonesia for portraying spirits, witches, and other supernatural beings. She was crowned the best female antagonist in Indonesian film industry along with Ruth Pelupessy and Mieke Wijaya.

Biography
Suzzanna, who was an Indo of mixed Javanese-Minahasan-Sundanese-German-Dutch heritage, was born Suzzanna Martha Frederica Van Osch on 13 October 1942 in Buitenzorg (now Bogor), West Java, as the youngest child from the six children to Willem Van Osch (1910–1942) and Johanna Bojoh (1915–1996). Her brothers were Janemann Van Osch (1938–1940), William Charles Van Osch (born 1946) and Buce Boyoh (1944–2016). While her sisters were Gerdina Johanna Maria Van Osch (1936–1978) and Irene Beatrix Van Osch (1940–1942).

Suzzanna entered acting in the 1958, following the success of Usmar Ismail's Tiga Dara (1956). Cashing in on the popularity of the film, numerous organizations had begun holding "Tiga Dara" competitions; Suzzana, who had been raised in Magelang, won one such competition in Yogyakarta. She was soon cast in Ismail's film Asrama Dara (1958), in which she portrayed Ina, the daughter of a politician who must stay at a boarding house for girls along with her sister who was played by Nurbani Yusuf. Advertising for this film emphasized Suzzanna and her role, drawing on the previous success of Tiga Dara by touting her as the next Indriati Iskak. Suzzanna's performance was well received by audiences, and in 1960 she was named Best Child Actress Award at the Asian Film Festival; she was also given recognition at the 1960 Indonesian Film Festival.

By the mid-1960s she had married fellow actor . Together, in 1965, they established the film production company Tri Murni Film, which produced only one film—Segenggam Tanah Perbatasan (1965), starring both Suzzanna and Suprapto—before closing. They collaborated on another film, Suzie, the following year. Their final effort, Tidar Jaya Film, was most successful; it produced four films between 1970 and 1973. In this film, Suzzanna took the role of Ratna, a woman who must protect her husband's land deeds while he is working in Borneo. Tidar Jaya subsequently produced Beranak dalam Kubur (1971), Bumi Makin Panas (1973), and Napsu Gila (1973); all of these featured Suzzanna.

Suzzanna's greatest popular success of the 1970s, however, came from another company. In this film, Suzzanna portrays a woman who travels to Jakarta in search of her husband, only to fall victim of a human trafficking ring. Controversial for its frank depictions of sexuality and coarse language, the film was banned in Bandung but nonetheless the most popular domestic production of the year. For this film, Suzzanna was crowned as Asia's most popular actress at the 1972 Asia-Pacific Film Festival in Seoul. She later decided that the film's depiction of sexuality was too frank, vowing to not take such roles in the future.

Suzzanna separated from Suprapto in 1974, shortly following Napsu Gila; Tidar Jaya ceased operations soon afterwards.

Indonesians knew her as The Indonesian Horror Queen, not only because of her acting but also because of her mystic lifestyle. Some people said that she looked young in her old age because she ate jasmine flowers.

She was married to actor Dicky Suprapto. After their separation (never divorced as their marriage was a Catholic marriage), she lived together with actor Clift Sangra. Her daughter from her marriage with Dicky Suprapto, Kiki Maria, is also an actress. She retired from films in the 1990s but made a comeback in Hantu Ambulance, 2008. However, it would be her final appearance.

Suzzanna died at her residence in Potrobangsan, North Magelang, Magelang, on 15 October 2008 at the age of 66, after 30 years of fighting with diabetes.

Filmography

Asrama Dara (1958)
Bertamasja (1959)
Mira (1961)
Aku Hanja Bajangan (1963)
Antara Timur dan Barat (1963)
Segenggam Tanah Perbatasan (1965)
Suzie (1966)
Bernafas dalam Lumpur (1970)
Tuan Tanah Kedawung (1970)
Air Mata Kekasih (1971)
Beranak dalam Kubur (1971)
Napsu Gila (1973)
Bumi Makin Panas (1973)
Ratapan dan Rintihan (1974)
Pulau Cinta (1978)
Permainan Bulan Desember (1980)
Ratu Ilmu Hitam (1981)
Sundel Bolong (1981)
Lembah Duka (1981)
Sangkuriang (1982)
Nyi Blorong (1982)
Nyi Ageng Ratu Pemikat (1983)
Perkawinan Nyi Blorong (1983)
Telaga Angker (1984)
Dia Sang Penakluk (1984)
Usia dalam Gejolak (1984)
Ratu Sakti Calon Arang (1985)
Bangunnya Nyi Roro Kidul (1985)
Petualangan Cinta Nyi Blorong (1986)
Malam Jumat Kliwon (1986)
Samson dan Delilah (1987)
Ratu Buaya Putih (1988)
Santet (1988)
Malam Satu Suro (1988)
Wanita Harimau (Santet II) (1989)
Pusaka Penyebar Maut (1990)
Titisan Dewi Ular (1990)
Perjanjian di Malam Keramat (1991)
Ajian Ratu Laut Kidul (1991)
Hantu Ambulance (2008)

Awards and nominations

See also 

 Horror icon
 Indonesian horror

References

Works cited

External links

1942 births
Sundanese people
2008 deaths
Deaths from diabetes
Indo people
Indonesian film actresses
Indonesian people of Dutch descent
Indonesian people of German descent
Indonesian Roman Catholics
Javanese people
Minahasa people
People from Bogor
Actresses from West Java
20th-century Indonesian actresses
Indonesian Christians